Antonio Roberto Cabrera Torres (born 10 November 1981) is a Chilean male  track cyclist. He competed in the team pursuit event at the 2012 UCI Track Cycling World Championships. 

Currently suspended of any funding due a domestic violence and abuse lawsuit presented by his ex-girlfriend who was also a cyclist. 

Antonio's ex-girlfriend Stephanie Subercaseaux committed suicide in Las Condes on 21 January 2023. Relatives claimed that her case was an example of "femicide suicide" due to the accusations of gender violence that she presented against her ex-boyfriend.

References

External links
 
 
 
 

1981 births
Living people
Chilean track cyclists
Chilean male cyclists
Place of birth missing (living people)
Cyclists at the 2003 Pan American Games
Cyclists at the 2011 Pan American Games
Cyclists at the 2015 Pan American Games
Cyclists at the 2019 Pan American Games
Pan American Games medalists in cycling
Pan American Games gold medalists for Chile
Pan American Games silver medalists for Chile
Pan American Games bronze medalists for Chile
Medalists at the 2003 Pan American Games
Medalists at the 2011 Pan American Games
Medalists at the 2019 Pan American Games
20th-century Chilean people
21st-century Chilean people